Shahrow (also Romanized as Shahrū) is a village in Isin Rural District, in the Central District of Bandar Abbas County, Hormozgan Province, Iran. At the 2006 census, its population was 208, in 76 families.

References 

Populated places in Bandar Abbas County